Sin Tat Plaza, is a shopping mall located in Sincere Building, 83 Argyle Street, Mong Kok, Hong Kong. Shops focus on the sales of mobile phones, mobile phone accessories, mobile phone repair services, and digital products.

The mall is three floors of typical small booth style shops, common to Hong Kong.  The aisle ways are narrow, and there are plenty of goods on display.  The shops are mostly oriented towards mobile phones, new and used, and repair of such phones.  There are also a few gaming and collectable figure shops on the second and third floor, and at least one adult oriented shop.  While this mall often has some of the best prices for phones, there can be issues related to grey market, parallel import, and other sources of products, which can lead to problems with manufacture warranty service.  If you are a tourist intending to buy to take to another country, this may not concern you as much.

References

External links
 

Mong Kok
Shopping centres in Hong Kong